= Iya Gbonkan =

Nigerian actress (born 1958)

Margaret Bandele Olayinka
- Born: Margaret Bandele Olayinka; 14 October 1958 (age 67); Nigeria
- Other names: Iya Gbonkan
- Occupation: Actress

Margaret Bandele Olayinka(born 14 September 1958), popularly known as Iya Gbonkan, is a Nigerian veteran actress, who is predominantly known for her scary facial expression.

== Career ==
Iya Gbonkan stars mostly as a mean witch in Yoruba movies; this is aided by her natural physique. She hit the spotlight in the early 1970s when she featured on Pa Yemi Elebu'bon a television series by Ifa Olokun and also in Olori Emere and in Yekinni Ajileye's Koto Orun.
